La Vida es un tango (Life is a Tango) is a 1939  Argentine musical film directed by Manuel Romero. The tango film starred Tito Lusiardo and Hugo del Carril.

Cast
Tito Lusiardo
Hugo del Carril

External links

1939 films
1930s Spanish-language films
Argentine black-and-white films
Tango films
Films directed by Manuel Romero
1939 musical films
Argentine musical films
1930s Argentine films